Vale is a minor Central Sudanic language of the Central African Republic, spoken in and to the west of the town of Batangafo. Tana (Tele) dialect is divergent and may be a distinct language.

References

Bongo–Bagirmi languages